Oligonicella bolliana is a species of praying mantis in the family Thespidae.

References

Thespidae
Insects described in 1894